Next Gen California (formerly known as Auto Club Speedway), originally opened as California Speedway, is a , low-banked, D-shaped oval superspeedway in unincorporated San Bernardino County, California, near Fontana. It has hosted NASCAR racing annually since 1997. It was also previously used for open wheel racing events. The track is owned and operated by NASCAR. The speedway is served by the nearby Interstate 10 and Interstate 15 freeways as well as a Metrolink station located behind the backstretch.

Construction of the track, on the site of the former Kaiser Steel Mill, began in 1995 and was completed in late 1996. The speedway's main grandstand has a capacity of 68,000, additionally it features 28 skyboxes and has a grand total capacity of 122,000. In 2006, a fanzone was added behind the main grandstand. Lights were added to the speedway in 2004 with the addition of a second annual NASCAR weekend. Since 2011, the track has hosted only one NASCAR weekend each year.

IndyCar previously ran a 500-mile race under Champ Car sanctioning from 1997 to 2002. The current IndyCar sanctioning previously ran a 400-mile race from 2002 to 2005 and a 500-mile race from 2012 to 2015, which was usually the season finale. Its last IndyCar race was the critically-acclaimed-to-be chaotic 2015 MAVTV 500.

Track history

Early history and construction 

On April 20, 1994, Roger Penske and Kaiser Steel announced the construction of a racetrack on the site of the abandoned Kaiser Steel Mill in Fontana, California. A day after the announcement, CART announced it would hold an annual race at the speedway. Three months later NASCAR president Bill France Jr. agreed to sanction NASCAR Cup Series races at the speedway upon completion, marking the first time NASCAR made a commitment to run a race at a track that had yet to be built. Community meetings were held to discuss issues related to the construction of the track and the local effects of events held. The local community largely supported construction of the speedway citing potentially increased land values and rejuvenation of the community. In April 1995, after having toured the sister track Michigan International Speedway, the San Bernardino County Board of Supervisors unanimously approved the project. The California Environmental Protection Agency gave Penske permission to begin construction after Kaiser agreed to pay US$6 million to remove hazardous waste from the site. Construction on the site began on November 22, 1995, with the demolition of the Kaiser Steel Mill. The  water tower, a landmark of the Kaiser property, was preserved in the center of the track to be used as a scoreboard.  of contaminated dirt was removed and transported to a toxic waste landfill. Construction of the track was completed in late 1996.

On January 10, 1997, Marlboro Team Penske's driver Paul Tracy became the first driver to test on the new speedway. NASCAR held its first open test session on at the track from May 5–7. The official opening and ribbon cutting ceremony was held on June 20, 1997, with the first race, a NASCAR West Series race, being held the next day.

Auto Club Speedway 
The track was named the California Speedway from the time it was built through February 21, 2008, when the Automobile Club of Southern California purchased the naming rights in a 10-year deal; thus the track became Auto Club Speedway and has remained as of 2023, as the deal was renewed. The sponsorship was discontinued after March of 2023.

Expansion and additions 
With early success following the opening of the track, the speedway began to expand reserved grandstand seating along the front stretch with an additional 15,777 seats. In May 1999, an additional 28 skyboxes were added to the top of the main grandstand. In 2001 the Auto Club Dragway, a  dragstrip, was built outside of the backstretch of the main speedway. That same year, the infield of the speedway was reconfigured to hold a multipurpose road course. On April 24, 2003, The San Bernardino County Planning Commission approved the changing of the speedway's conditional use permit to allow the installation of lights around the track. Later that year NASCAR announced a second annual NASCAR Cup Series race at the track for the 2004 season, with the second race being run "under the lights". NASCAR ran two weekends of racing annually until the 2011 season, when the track returned to a single annual race weekend.

In 2006, the speedway's midway, located behind the main grandstand, was overhauled. The new midway, called the "Discover IE FanZone", includes the addition of Apex (a Wolfgang Puck restaurant), additional shade and lounge areas, a retail store and an entertainment stage.

In March 2014, the Las Vegas-based company Exotics Racing expanded to California by opening a new 1.2 mile road course at the Auto Club Speedway.

Configurations

Attendance problems 
Upon the addition of a second NASCAR weekend at the track in 2004, attendance at the races dropped off dramatically, by as much as 20,000. With such a large attendance swing, drivers and media began to doubt if the track deserved two dates, even if the track was near Los Angeles, the nation's second-largest media market. Weather also became a concern with either extremely hot days or with rain threatening the races. All of this factored into NASCAR's decision to remove a second race from the track with the realignment of the 2011 NASCAR schedule. Former track owner Roger Penske said the track may be located in a one-race market. Track president Gillian Zucker cited bad weather windows and fans having other entertainment options as reasons for the attendance decline.

Effective in the 2014 racing season, the grandstand capacity was reduced from 92,000 to 68,000. This was accomplished by removing approximately 12,000 seats near turn 1 and installing a hospitality area and a digital display showing speeds along the straightaway. In addition, seats were further reduced as a result of modifying average seat width from 18 inches to 23 inches. The capacity quoted does not include luxury boxes and infield seating, which when added up reaches a capacity of approximately 100,000.

Name change 
On February 21, 2008, the Automobile Club of Southern California (ACSC) became the title sponsor of the raceway, making Auto Club Speedway the track's official name. The naming rights deal is for ten years and is worth an estimated $50 to $75 million. In addition to naming rights, the ACSC will have use of the facility for road tests for Westways magazine and other consumer tests. The money will be used for capital improvements to the track.

In popular culture 
The facility is often used for filming television shows, commercials and films. In 2000, portions of Charlie's Angels were filmed at the speedway, and in 2005, portions of Herbie: Fully Loaded were filmed there. In 2007, The Bucket List saw Jack Nicholson and Morgan Freeman drive a vintage Shelby Mustang and Dodge Challenger around the  speedway. The track was used as Daytona International Speedway in the 2019 film Ford v Ferrari.

A parody of the track was used in the 2006 Disney/Pixar animated film Cars in the end of the film. It is the venue for the Piston Cup tiebreaker race between the movie's main character Lightning McQueen (voiced by Owen Wilson), retiring veteran Strip "The King" Weathers (voiced by Richard Petty) and perennial runner-up Chick Hicks (voiced by Michael Keaton). The race is held at the Los Angeles International Speedway, which is a conglomeration of the Los Angeles Memorial Coliseum, the Arroyo Seco in Pasadena where the Rose Bowl is located, as well as the Auto Club Speedway.

Fatalities 
During the 1999 Marlboro 500 CART race, Canadian driver Greg Moore died in a crash along the backstretch of the track. It was determined that after sliding along the infield grass, Moore's car hit the edge of oncoming pavement, which caused the car to flip into a concrete retaining wall. The incident prompted the track owners, ISC, to pave the backstretch of both Auto Club Speedway and its sister track Michigan International Speedway in an attempt to prevent a similar accident. Shortly after the crash, CART mandated the use of a head-and-neck restraint system on all ovals. The rule eventually became mandatory on all tracks.

On April 5, 2002, Ricky Lundgren was killed in a qualifying session for a motorcycle race.

On August 7, 2004, a police officer from San Diego, John Barr, died during an open track event after coming off his motorcycle.

On June 2, 2005, two men died while participating in an event sponsored by the San Diego Chapter of the Ferrari Club of America.

On October 15, 2010, a 24-year-old woman died while participating in a driving school at the track. The woman was driving a replica Indycar as part of the Mario Andretti Racing Experience when she lost control and hit the inside wall of the track.

Planned reconstruction 
On September 8, 2020, it was revealed that documents for the reconstruction of the facility as a half-mile high banked oval had been filed with San Bernardino County. As first reported by The Insider, the new short track layout would feature long straightaways like Martinsville Speedway and high banked turns like those featured at Bristol Motor Speedway. According to the published preliminary site plan, the new layout would fit inside the footprint of the current layout's trioval, and utilize much of the existing infrastructure such as the garages (which would be outside the new track), main grandstand and pit road suites (which would overlook the relocated backstretch). The work would be scheduled to start after the 2021 Auto Club 400, and was scheduled to be completed in time for the 2022 season.

In December 2020, it was announced that the 2021 race weekend had been cancelled due to complications surrounding the COVID-19 pandemic. On February 27, 2022, Auto Club Speedway president Dave Allen announced on Sirius XM NASCAR Radio that plans to convert the speedway have been put on hold. With the Busch Light Clash now being held at the Los Angeles Memorial Coliseum beginning in 2022, there was now no official commitment from NASCAR to follow through with plans to convert the speedway. In early 2023, following the Busch Light Clash at The Coliseum, NASCAR COO Steve O'Donnell made mention that NASCAR was, "evaluating the market as a whole and what's the best place for us to race within the totality of 2024 and beyond."

Racing events

Current races 
 NASCAR Cup Series:
Pala Casino 400 (1997–2020, 2022–2023)
 NASCAR Xfinity Series:
Production Alliance Group 300 (1997–2020, 2022–2023)
 Shell Eco-marathon Americas
ChampCar Endurance Series
The Wilwood Grand Prix at Auto Club Speedway

Former races 
 NASCAR Cup Series
Pepsi Max 400 (2004–2010)
 NASCAR Camping World Truck Series
San Bernardino County 200 (1997–2009)
 NASCAR West Series (1997–2006)
 CART
Marlboro 500 (1997–2002)
 IndyCar Series
MAVTV 500 (2002–2005, 2012–2015)
 Rolex Sports Car Series
Grand American 400 (sports car course) (2002–2005)
 IROC (1997–1998, 2002)
 All Japan Grand Touring Car Championship (2004, exhibition race)

Other events 
 Red, White and Cruise  — A July 4 festival consisting of a car show, various family-friendly entertainment and a fireworks show
 Epicenter 2010 at the speedway's midway
 Cardenas Festival — The annual Cardenas Festival is held in the parking lot. This is a festival where all the companies that sell food at the Cardenas supermarket chain give out free samples of new or upcoming food. There are also performances from many artists.
Hard (music festival) was held in 2016, 2018, and 2019 in the midway and parking lot of the speedway.

Track length of paved oval 
The track length is disputed by CART and NASCAR that run at Auto Club Speedway. The NASCAR timing and scoring use a length of exactly . The IRL timing and scoring use also a length of exactly  since their first race in 2002.

Track records 

As of August 2018, this is the fastest qualifying lap speed ever recorded at an official race meeting.

Lap Records 
The fastest official race lap records at Auto Club Speedway (formerly California Speedway) are listed as:

NASCAR Cup Series stats 
(As of 3/1/20)

* from minimum 5 starts

NASCAR Cup Series race winners 

* – Race extended due to green-white-checker finish
** – Race shortened due to rain

Open wheel race winners

References

External links 

  Official  Auto Club Speedway website
 
 RacingCircuits.info: Map and circuit history
 Auto Club Speedway Page on NASCAR.com
 Jayski's Auto Club Speedway Page — current and past California Speedway News.
 Trackpedia guide to driving this track
 Auto Club Speedway Page on Ballparks by Munsey & Suppes

 
Auto Club
Auto Club
Auto Club
Auto Club
Auto Club
Auto Club
Auto Club
Auto Club
Auto Club